Mark Robinson (born  21 November 1968 in Manchester, England) is an English former footballer who played as a full back for English clubs West Bromwich Albion, Barnsley, Newcastle United, Swindon Town and Chippenham Town.

Robinson started his career with Midlands-based outfit West Brom where he made only 2 league outings before a move to Barnsley.

Robinson played over 150 games for the Tykes becoming a firm fans faviouate. This then led to Kevin Keegan paying £450,000 to take the defender to Newcastle United, March 1993. Robinson helped the Magpies secure promotion to the Premier League later that season.

In 1994 he suffered a broken leg in a horror tackle by a Hartlepool player, and Keegan said "we came to Hartlepool to help the club out financially, and we've ended up with a player fighting to save his career". Kevin Keegan also once said he would never return to Hartlepool's Victoria Park after a pre-season friendly went wrong.

He was signed for a substantial amount by Keegan to bolster the defence, but was never the same player after the game at Hartlepool. He lost a lot of pace, which was his major strength.

Robinson made only 16 appearances during Newcastle's return to the top flight and in the summer of 1994 Swindon Town paid £600,000 for his services.

Robinson spent the rest of his professional career at the Wiltshire outfit playing 316 matches - scoring 4 times. Robinson was voted the 32nd all-time best Swindon Town player to pull on the red shirt.

After injuries plagued him during the 2001–02 season Robinson retired from professional football and joined nearby Chippenham Town.

He has 3 sons called Elliot, Harry and Bailey, and a daughter called Lucy.

References

1968 births
Living people
Footballers from Rochdale
English footballers
Association football defenders
West Bromwich Albion F.C. players
Barnsley F.C. players
Newcastle United F.C. players
Swindon Town F.C. players
Chippenham Town F.C. players
English Football League players
Premier League players